Avgusta ( or ) is a Russian Christian first name, the female form of the male first name Avgust. It is derived from the Latin word Augusta, meaning sacred, and was used as an honorific in ancient Rome. Its colloquial forms and diminutives include Ava, Gusta, Gustya, Ustya, Gusya, Gutya, and Aga.

"Avgusta" is also a colloquial form of the female first name Avgustina and a diminutive of the male first name Avgustin.

References

Notes

Sources
Н. А. Петровский (N. A. Petrovsky). "Словарь русских личных имён" (Dictionary of Russian First Names). ООО Издательство "АСТ". Москва, 2005. 
А. В. Суперанская (A. V. Superanskaya). "Современный словарь личных имён: Сравнение. Происхождение. Написание" (Modern Dictionary of First Names: Comparison. Origins. Spelling). Айрис-пресс. Москва, 2005.